Gerard Maguire (born 25 September 1945) also credited as Gerard McGuire,  is an Australian actor, producer and screenwriter best known for his role as in Prisoner as Deputy Governor, Jim Fletcher. Often appearing on Australian television police dramas and soap operas throughout the 1970s and 80s, he is also one of Australia's top voice actors, voicing numerous commercials and narrations during the 1990s and early 2000s.

Biography

Early life

Maguire was born in 1945 and began acting during the late 1960s, shortly after graduating from the National Institute of Dramatic Art with a Diploma of Dramatic Art. Out of 3,000 applicants, he was one of 15 students to complete the program.

Early career

After minor one-time roles on the television series Riptide and The Link Men, Maguire made his feature film debut in The Demonstrator with Joe James and Irene Inescort. In the film, he portrayed university student Steve Slater whose political differences with his father Joe Slater, a Federal cabinet minister, result in his leading a series of protests disrupting his father's activities in organising an international conference. The film was considered a commercial failure. Following this he starred in film Country Town (1971) Country Town was a feature film spin-off from Australian Broadcasting Corporation soap opera Bellbird.

In the late 1960s and the 1970s he was a guest actor on drama series Dynasty, Ryan, and on police procedural series Matlock Police, Homicide, Division 4 and Cop Shop. Joining the Melbourne Theatre Company, he also performed in Going Home at St. Martin's Theatre on 11 March 1976. That same year, he starred with Tom Oliver and Kate Sheil in David Williamson's A Handful of Friends at the Russell Street Theatre in Melbourne. Maguire went on to supporting roles in the television miniseries Luke's Kingdom and the film Mad Dog Morgan. In 1978 he was part of the cast in the first public performance of Kenneth G. Ross's important Australian play Breaker Morant: A Play in Two Acts, presented by the Melbourne Theatre Company at the Athenaeum Theatre, in Melbourne, Victoria, Australia, on 2 February 1978. A late arrival during the first season of Prisoner, Maguire joined the cast in mid 1979 as Deputy Governor Jim Fletcher and eventually became the only main male character during his three years on the series. Maguire eventually left "Prisoner" during the show's 4th season in early 1982. During his last year with the series, he appeared with Prisoner co-stars Colette Mann and Val Lehman in Kitty and the Bagman (1982). 

During 1983, Maguire starred as Dr. John Rivers in the television series Starting Out. As one of the school's tutors and the father of the disfigured Michelle (Rowena Mohr), his time on the series dealt with his guilt over his daughter's accident while dealing with his unhappily married wife Yvonne (Suzy Gashler).

After the series cancellation, Maguire made a guest appearance on Special Squad and had supporting roles in The Surfer and Alice to Nowhere before returning to the stage in 1986 to perform in David Williamson's Sons of Cain which ran for five-months in London's West End. In 1987, was a television presenter for Ground Zero and appeared in one episode of The Flying Doctors during the next two years. Maguire also appeared during the final season of the soap opera The Power, The Passion as a police investigator and ex-boyfriend of one of the central characters, Ellen Byrne Edmonds (Olivia Hamnett).

Producing and writing

While producing a film adaptation of a novel during the mid-1980s, he replaced the screenwriter originally working on the screenplay. Contacted by Columbia Pictures, he flew to California to discuss the project, he met producer and then Senior Vice-President Jane Alsobrook. He soon began a romantic relationship and Maguire ended up staying in Los Angeles for the next several years. In 1993, he and Lance Peters co-wrote Gross Misconduct later directed by George T. Miller and, the following year, wrote Seduce Me: Pamela Principle 2 and was the script supervisor for Tunnel Vision. He was also involved in acting workshops with actors such as Jon Voight among others.

Return to Australia

In 1995, he moved back to Australia with Alsobrook when she accepted a position as president of Australia's largest independent film production and distribution company, REP. During the mid-to-late 1990s, Maguire appeared in the television movies Heart of Fire, The Fury Within and The Finder as well as the guest appearances on the television series Water Rats, Murder Call and All Saints. He became a voice actor, eventually narrating hundreds of commercials and, in 1995, was the voice of Titanium Man in the cartoon Iron Man. During the 2000 Summer Olympics in Sydney, he was the announcer during the diving events.

Following the September 11 attacks, he moved to the United States allowing his wife to be closer to her family in Sedona, Arizona. Although continuing to be involved in a number of film projects with his wife, he also became involved in local theatre agreeing to appear in theatrical performances with the Canyon Moon Theatre Company and, in April 2002, appeared as the narrator in Side By Side By Sondheim at the Old Marketplace in West Sedona.

Internet film

Maguire continued working as a voice actor during the next several years via the internet. After a five-year absence, Maguire made an appearance in the 2007 independent film Brothel.

As of 2013 Gerard lives in Arizona

Filmography

References

External links
 

1945 births
Living people
Australian male film actors
Australian male soap opera actors
Australian male stage actors
Australian male voice actors
Australian people of Irish descent
20th-century Australian male actors
21st-century Australian male actors